Tremulous is a free and open source asymmetric team-based first-person shooter with real-time strategy elements. Being a cross-platform development project the game is available for Windows, Linux, and Mac OS X.

The game features two opposing teams: humans and aliens. Each team must attack the enemy's base and team members while defending their own base.

Gameplay 
Tremulous is an asymmetric team-based first-person shooter with elements of real time strategy.  Each team may construct and defend a base, consisting of structures which aid the players in some way. Players spawn from a spawn structure.

During a match, players may attack the enemy, or maintain the base and construct new structures. Humans utilize various weapons, armor and other upgrades, while aliens may evolve into more powerful classes, each of which possesses unique abilities.

The teams do not have access to all possible upgrades and buildings at the beginning of the game. Each team must reach a threshold of frags in order to advance to the next developmental stage. The point at which a stage change occurs varies dynamically depending on the number of players on each team. Each new stage brings more upgrades for the humans and more classes for the aliens.

In addition to requiring a certain stage, each human item or alien class must be purchased using currency earned in game. The aliens are awarded frags for killing their foes which may be used to evolve (these points are commonly called evolution points or evos by players). The Humans gain credits. Players earn currency by killing enemy players or by destroying enemy spawn or power structures (Reactor and Overmind); the amount of received currency depends on what class the opponent was (or what structure was destroyed) and how much of the target's total damage was dealt by the killing player. As a mechanism to encourage builders, who naturally don't engage in combat, players are also rewarded currency every two minutes by simply staying alive.

Builders are responsible for construction of new buildings and base maintenance. Each building takes up a certain number of build points available to each team. The number of build points can vary from map to map and server to server, limiting how large bases can become. To reduce the likelihood of the match ending in a tie, most games enter a sudden death mode ten to fifteen minutes before the draw/tie time limit. This is a period during which the building of most or all structures is prohibited, allowing attackers to more easily overwhelm the defenders.

For the longest while, Tremulous and the entirety of its gameplay was plagued by a group of sinister and destructive individuals. These seemingly harmless online ruffians were represented by a group called BIT which stood for BACK IN TOWN, referencing their return to the game to carry out wicked maneuvers after being kicked or subnet banned. A few of the individuals in this group went by the names; Manny's Chips, St Theresa Foods and Red Baron. Upon joining a server, these players would join either the Aliens or the Humans and blend in with their fellow team mates, unbeknown to the rest of the server what would soon happen after a few minutes of casual gameplay.
At any given point in time after the initial camouflage tactic, one of the three users would issue a bind, which would then send a message to all of the players in the general in-game chat that would read; I AM RECEIVING AN AWARD TONIGHT FOR SOMETHING COOL. After which, a curious player that either represented the Aliens or the 'Humans team would ask what the award was for. As soon as a response was received, the player responsible for the initial bind would issue another, more worrying message. If this player was on the Humans team, the bind would read; REACTOR DECONSTRUCTION and the player would immediately bring the game to its knees by removing the main power source of the Human base, rendering all the players on this team as well as their equipment completely useless and vulnerable to the Alien team. This then caused mass hysteria and panic among the Human players as a new Reactor takes a considerable amount of time to construct before order is restored to the Human base. Some speculate this was due to a million Dollar betting scheme, using outlandish tactics to favor one team over the other.
Should one of these devious players represent the Alien team, the same first bind would be issued, and like clockwork, as soon as a response was received, this player would remove the Overmind and render the Alien team vulnerable at the hands of the Human team.

Following this reign of tyranny, any of the guilty players would then celebrate their disrespectful acts by spamming the in-game chat with yet another bind. YEAH YEAH YEAH YEAH YEAH YEAH would be repeated over and over again to all the players in the server to instill commotion, rage, anger and hatred towards the self identified suspects. The community was shook by these actions and attempts to ruin the online experience for thousands of casual and experienced players.
While the game is still active with a small player base, reports of BIT have been scarce, with some speculating that this group have now moved onto other online games to wreak havoc amongst community members. One can never be too certain. 

 Aliens 

The alien base is centered on a structure called the "Overmind", which is needed for their other structures to function and new structures to be built. Unlike the Human team structures, aliens may build on walls and ceilings to tactically build. Eggs provide a creep which allows nearby alien structures to live and be built, allowing for aliens to easily build offensive forward bases. Without a creep, alien structures will self destruct.

Aliens spawn from Eggs which work even when the Overmind is dead, but new eggs cannot be built without it.

As they earn frags, alien players can evolve into a new form in order to upgrade their health and gain new abilities. As the vast majority of alien attacks are melee attacks, most of these creatures depend on agility and special movement techniques such as wall-walk, wall-jump, charging and pouncing over long distances to close the distance between themselves and their enemy.

Alien players and structures automatically regenerate over time.

 Humans 

Humans spawn from structures called "Telenodes", which function in much the same way as aliens' eggs.

At the core of the human base is the "Reactor", responsible for powering nearly all other base equipment. If it is destroyed, the Reactor will explode unless deconstructed (removed by a builder), often critically damaging or eliminating nearby players and structures and leaving automated defenses and upgrade structures unpowered; if it is not immediately replaced the human team is usually defeated.

Humans do not have different classes; instead they can buy and sell upgrades at a structure called the "Armory". These upgrades include armor, jet packs, and weaponry.

Human players do not automatically regenerate health over time, however they are equipped with a one-time use medkit which heals the remaining health at the time of activation over a period of time, and can be replenished at a medical station.

 Development 
Tremulous' development by the Dark Legion group commenced in early 2000 as a modification for the commercial computer game Quake III Arena. The gameplay is generally inspired by the Quake II modification Gloom, which also features alien vs human teams with distinct user classes. Although, Tremulous shares no content with Gloom or other similar themed games from around the same time.

Another game with features similar to Tremulous was Natural Selection, but Tremulous developers say it is neither based on it nor inspired by it. According to the developers, development on the game began long before NS became publicly available.

Following the release of the Quake III Arena source code under the GPL on August 19, 2005, the developers decided to rework Tremulous into a standalone, free and open source game. Tremulous is licensed under the GPL, although it includes code from other projects that was released under other GPL-compatible licenses. Most of the game media is licensed under the CC BY-SA 2.5 Creative Commons license.

Its initial standalone version 1.0.0 was released on August 11, 2005. With the stable version 1.1.0 released on March 31, 2006 the game change its game engine to ioquake3, a modified id Tech 3 engine. In 2008, Tony J. White of the ETPub mod for Wolfenstein: Enemy Territory, contributed an administrative system and a backported client that were soon incorporated into the official Subversion repository. The latest public build version on the icculus repository is 1.2 beta "Gameplay Preview" (aka GPP), released on December 4, 2009 with the latest updates released on November 8, 2011.

A Tremulous continuation from Dark Legion has its source code repository migrated to GitHub and is not under active development (last commit June 2016).

 Derivatives 
Unvanquished is a Tremulous-based FPS with another engine (Daemon), which was first released publicly in 2012 and is under active development. It includes many original maps and is able to run Tremulous maps with some distributed in a community pack. Some Unvanquished official maps were community maps for Tremulous.

Murnatan, currently in development by the Czech development team, AAA Games. The game is based on a Tremulous server modification which was worked on by the same lead developer of AAA Games, but due to licensing problems, has had some changes away from its previous title Tremulous 2 and concept work, many of which was already completed. The title was approved for Steam Greenlight within 7 days.

 Reception 
Joe Barr of NewsForge called Tremulous his favorite free software FPS game.Tremulous was voted Player's Choice Standalone Game of the Year in Mod Database's Mod of the Year 2006 competition.Tremulous later came in first in a "Best free game based on GPL Quake source?" poll on the Planet Quake website. At the beginning of 2007, Tremulous also took first place in the Mod Database "Mod of the Year" 2006 competition under the category of "Player's Choice Standalone Game of the Year" as well as honorable mentions in "Genre Award: Action" and "Editor's Choice Standalone Game of the Year". Tremulous was also mentioned in Games for Windows (formerly Computer Gaming World): 101 Free Games Issue for 2007. Tremulous'' was selected in March 2010 as "HotPick" by Linux Format.

See also 
List of free first-person shooters
id Tech 3
List of open source games
List of video games derived from modifications

References

External links 

 Tremulous official website

2006 video games
First-person shooters
AmigaOS 4 games
Linux games
Windows games
Classic Mac OS games
Shooter video games
Strategy video games
Multiplayer online games
Quake III Arena mods
First-person strategy video games
Open-source video games
Creative Commons-licensed video games
Asymmetrical multiplayer video games